AAII may refer to:

 Air Accidents Investigation Institute, a government agency in the Czech Republic
 American Association of Individual Investors
 Australian Artificial Intelligence Institute
 AutoAnalyzer II, see AutoAnalyzer#Commercialization